Friendship (formerly, Jordans) is an unincorporated community in Wake County, North Carolina, United States. It lies at an elevation of 390 feet (119 m).

History 
Friendship was named for a Native American pow wow in the early 20th century, in which African-Americans, whites, and Native Americans agreed to live in peace.

Education 
Apex Friendship High School is located in the community. The naming of the high school  was marked by  some controversy, as local residents wanted to preserve the communities' history of the area by adding the name "Friendship", while many others thought "Friendship" was an inappropriate name for a high school and that "West Apex High School" would help students feel more connected. Ultimately, the Wake County School Board voted in favor of the name Apex Friendship High School.

The affiliated schools in the community that cater for the other age groups include Apex Friendship Elementary School and Apex Friendship Middle School.

References

Unincorporated communities in Wake County, North Carolina
Unincorporated communities in North Carolina